Meena Hazara is a gold medalist who participated in the 2010 South Asian Games in Dhaka, Bangladesh. She represented Pakistan in Karate.

See also

List of Hazara people
Fariba Rezayee
Abrar Hussain

References

Living people
Pakistani people of Hazara descent
Hazara sportspeople
Sportspeople from Quetta
Pakistani female karateka
Year of birth missing (living people)
South Asian Games gold medalists for Pakistan